Trupanea lyneborgi is a species of fruit fly in the genus Trupanea of the family Tephritidae.

Distribution
New Ireland.

References

Tephritinae
Insects described in 1970
Diptera of Asia